Soviet-occupied Lithuania may refer to:
 Lithuanian Soviet Socialist Republic
 Soviet occupation of the Baltic states (1940), including Lithuania
 Soviet re-occupation of the Baltic states (1944), including Lithuania

See also 
 Baltic states under Soviet rule (1944–1991)
 German occupation of the Baltic states during World War II
 German occupation of Lithuania during World War II
 Museum of Occupations and Freedom Fights
 Occupation of Lithuania by Nazi Germany
 Occupation of the Baltic states